Dylan de Braal (born 19 August 1994) is a Dutch footballer who plays as a centre back for Derde Divisie club SteDoCo.

Club career
He made his professional debut in the Eerste Divisie for RKC Waalwijk on 28 September 2014 in a game against Achilles '29.

In the summer 2019, De Braal joined FC Dordrecht.

On 7 April 2021, De Braal agreed to sign for Tweede Divisie club IJsselmeervogels on a one-year contract starting 1 July.

References

External links
 
 

1994 births
Living people
Footballers from The Hague
Association football defenders
Dutch footballers
ADO Den Haag players
FC Den Bosch players
RKC Waalwijk players
TOP Oss players
IJsselmeervogels players
Helmond Sport players
FC Dordrecht players
Eerste Divisie players
VSV TONEGIDO players